Homeshake (stylized as HOMESHAKE) is the solo musical project of Montreal-based singer-songwriter and musician Peter Sagar.

Featuring contributions from Mark Goetz, Greg Napier, and Brad Loughead, the project started in 2012. In 2014, he left Mac DeMarco's live band to focus on the Homeshake project; Fixture Records released his debut cassette, The Homeshake Tape, in January 2013 with a second, titled Dynamic Meditation released in October 2013 . This was followed by his debut full-length album, In the Shower (2014) and his second album, Midnight Snack (2015). His third album under the project, Fresh Air was released in 2017. His fourth album, Helium  was released in 2019.

Discography

Studio albums
 In the Shower (2014)
 Midnight Snack (2015)
 Fresh Air (2017)
 Helium (2019)
 Under The Weather (2021)

Remix albums
  Helium Remixes (2019)

EPs 
 Haircut (2020)

Singles
 "Making a Fool of You" (2014)
 "Cash Is Money" (2014)
 "I Don't Play" (2015)
 "Heat" (2015)
 "Faded" (2015)
 "Give It to Me" (2015)
 ";(" (2016)
 "Call Me Up" (2016)
 "Every Single Thing" (2017)
 "Khmlwugh" (2017)
 "Like Mariah" (2018)
 "Nothing Could Be Better" (2018)
 "Just Like My"  (2019)
 "Another Thing" (2019)
 "Sesame" (2020)
 "I Know I know I know" (2021)

Cassettes and mixtapes
 The Homeshake Tape (2013)
 Dynamic Meditation (2013)

References

External links

Musical groups established in 2012
Canadian indie pop groups
Canadian indie pop musicians
Musical groups from Montreal
One-man bands
Canadian rhythm and blues musicians
2012 establishments in Quebec